Raoof Valiullah was an Indian National Congress politician  from Gujarat. He was a member of Rajya Sabha from 1984 to 1990. He was shot dead by the underworld gang in 1992.

References

People murdered in Gujarat
Assassinated Indian politicians
Politicians from Ahmedabad
Valiullah Raoof
1992 deaths
1945 births
Indian National Congress politicians from Gujarat
20th-century Indian politicians
1992 murders in India